A religious goods store, also known as a religious bookstore, religious gifts store or religious supplies shop, is a store specializing in supplying materials used in the practice of a particular religious tradition, such as Buddhism, Taoism, Chinese folk religion, Christianity and Islam among other religions.

These shops are abundant across Iran and the Greater Chinese region as well as Overseas Chinese communities around the world.

In Iran religious goods store are usually visited to buy Quran, Al Mafatih-Al Jinan or many other good like tasbīḥ and many other things.

One of the services related to this is to add a page to Mafatih al-Jinan book for a deceased loved one. 

In Christendom, religious goods stores are often visited to purchase Christian art, books and devotional material for the home, as well as gifts such as a Bible, daily devotional or cross necklace for occasions such as Baptism, Confirmation and Holy Matrimony.

Items for sale

Christianity
In Christendom, "religious goods stores", also known as "Christian bookstores", have Family Bibles, Christian art, daily devotional books, breviaries, catechisms, cross necklaces, Christian music albums, holy cards, home altars, prie-dieus, and prayer beads (such as the Dominican Rosary of Catholicism, the Wreath of Christ of Lutheranism, the Anglican Rosary of Anglicanism, and the Chotki of Eastern Orthodoxy), among other sacramentals.

Chinese folk religion and Taoism
Statues representing Chinese deities, also include Bodhisattva images like Guanyin or Di Zang Wang
Tong Sheng (通勝), Chinese divination guide and almanac
all form of Chinese incenses, kemenyan and candles
incense papers, underworld bank notes and various forms of paper offerings
tablets dedicated to Tian Gong (天公), Tu Di Gong (土地公), Zao Jun (灶君) and ancestral tablets
unconsecrated religious devotional objects like Pa-Kua, Qian Kun Tai Ji Tu and Shang Hai Zheng 
incense urns or incense holders
Chinese teapots, tea cups and Chinese tea leaves
incense paper burners
incense sticks

Gallery

See also
Chinese folk religion
Chinese folk religion in Southeast Asia
Chinese ancestral worship
Ancestral hall & Ancestral tablets
Dajiao
Zhizha
Papier-mache offering shops in Hong Kong

References

 
Chinese folk religion
Religious objects
Religion in Taiwan
Religion in Hong Kong
Religion in Singapore
Religion in Malaysia
Retailing in China
Retailing in Taiwan
Retailing in Hong Kong
Retailing in Singapore